Feelin' Bitchy  is a 1977 album by singer-songwriter, Millie Jackson. It features two of Jackson's best known songs, the Merle Haggard cover "If You're Not Back in Love by Monday" (which became a U.S. pop hit for Jackson), and the Latimore track "All the Way Lover". The latter features one of Millie's trademark extended raps, this time on the topic of men who refuse to perform oral sex on their partners.

Track listings
"All The Way Lover" (Benny Latimore)	10:44	
"Lovin' Your Good Thing Away" (George Jackson, Raymond Moore)	3:11	
"Angel in Your Arms" (Clayton Ivey, Terry Woodford, Tommy Brasfield)	4:02	
"A Little Taste of Outside Love" (George Jackson)	3:41	
"You Created a Monster" (Lamont Dozier)	2:24	
"Cheatin' Is" (Rafe Van Hoy)	3:20	
"If You're Not Back in Love By Monday" (Glenn Martin, Sonny Throckmorton)	4:45	
"Feelin' Like a Woman" (David Sackoff, Randolph Klein)	4:26

Personnel
Millie Jackson – vocals
Jimmy Johnson, Ken Bell, Larry Byrom – guitar
David Hood – bass
Barry Beckett, Tim Henson – keyboards
Roger Hawkins – drums
Tom Roady – percussion
Spiderman Harrison – male vocals
Brandye (Cynthia Douglas, Donna Davis, Pam Vincent) – background vocals
David Van DePitte – horn arrangements
Mike Lewis – string arranger
Ernie Winfrey – Remix Engineer

Charts

Singles

References

External links
 Millie Jackson-Feelin Bitchy at Discogs

1977 albums
Millie Jackson albums
Albums produced by Brad Shapiro
Spring Records albums
Albums recorded at Muscle Shoals Sound Studio